The constitution of the United Kingdom is an uncodified constitution made up of various statutes, judicial precedents, convention, treaties and other sources. Beginning in the Middle Ages, the constitution developed gradually in response to various crises. By the 20th century, the British monarchy had become a constitutional and ceremonial monarchy, and Parliament developed into a representative body exercising parliamentary sovereignty.

Initially, the constitutional systems of the four constituent countries of the United Kingdom developed separately under English domination. The Kingdom of England conquered Wales in 1283, but it was only later through the Laws in Wales Acts 1535 and 1542 that the country was brought completely under English law. While technically a separate state, the Kingdom of Ireland was ruled by the English monarchy.  

From 1603 to 1707, England and the Kingdom of Scotland shared the same monarch as part of the Union of the Crowns; however, each nation maintained separate governments. In 1707, England and Scotland were joined in the Kingdom of Great Britain. In 1801, Great Britain and Ireland were joined in the United Kingdom of Great Britain and Ireland. While the United Kingdom remains a unitary state in which Parliament is sovereign, a process of devolution began in the 20th and 21st centuries that saw Parliament restore self-government to Scotland, Wales and Northern Ireland. 

Aspects of the British constitution were adopted in the constitutions and legal systems of other countries around the world, particularly those that were part of, or formerly part of, the British Empire including the United States and those countries that adopted the Westminster parliamentary system. The British constitution is the source of the modern concepts of the rule of law, parliamentary sovereignty and judicial independence and adoption of British constitutional principles propagated their spread around the world.

Kingdom of England

Anglo-Saxon government (pre-1066) 

Prior to the 9th century, England consisted of various Anglo-Saxon kingdoms ruled by kings whose primary role was as warrior and protector of his people. An Anglo-Saxon king was advised by a group of councilors or "wise men" called a witan, composed of lords and church leaders. The witan was consulted when creating law, and it was also the highest court in the land where the king gave final judgment in person. In times of crisis or when a king was too young to rule, the witan may have assumed greater role over government.

Following the Christianisation of the Anglo-Saxons, written law codes or "dooms" were produced, the earliest being the Law of Æthelberht . Early Anglo-Saxon laws were mainly concerned with preventing blood feuds by mandating criminals make compensation (Old English ) to victims or the victim's family for injuries or death. In the case of death, the victim's family was owed the wergild ("man price"). These laws were enforced by the family of the victim—not the king. Anglo-Saxon society was hierarchical and one's wergild was greater or lesser depending on social status:  

 King
 Ætheling (prince)
 Ealdorman (greater nobleman)
 Thegn (lesser nobleman)
 Ceorl (low-ranking freeman)
 Slaves (By the 12th century, slavery in Britain was transformed into a form of serfdom with a class of peasant known as villeins.)

In the 9th and 10th centuries, the Anglo-Saxon kingdoms were consolidated under the rule of the House of Wessex into a single Kingdom of England. Around 890, Alfred the Great compiled the largest Anglo-Saxon law code, the Doom book, possibly to replace the various regional laws of his expanding kingdom. The current British coronation service largely dates back to 973. Edgar the Peaceful and subsequent monarchs swore a coronation oath to protect the English church, defend their people against enemies, and to administer justice.

While a capital existed at Winchester (where the royal treasury was located), the king and his itinerant court moved constantly throughout the kingdom. Priests attached to the king's chapel acted as royal secretaries—writing letters, charters, and other official documents. Under Edward the Confessor, the office of chancellor appears for the first time. Regenbald, the first chancellor, kept the king's seal and oversaw the writing of charters and writs. The treasury had probably developed into a permanent institution by the time of King Cnut. During the Confessor's reign, supervision of the treasury was one of the responsibilities of the king's  or chamberlains. Initially, the king did not tax his subjects but was owed service in the form of the —fyrd service, burh building, and bridge building. The only direct tax was the Danegeld, which was paid seven times between 996 and 1118. Other government functions were paid for by income from the royal estates and court fines and fees.

By the tenth century, England was divided into shires and subdivided into hundreds. The hundred was the basic unit of government with its own hundred court. The hundred court met monthly to consider issues such as property disputes and breaches of the king's peace. All free men over the age of twelve were expected to attend, and it was these local men who gave judgment in disputes as there was no judge. The hundred was administered by a reeve, who enforced court decisions and collected royal revenue. The shire court met twice a year and was presided over by the "shire reeve" or sheriff. Sheriffs enforced royal justice, maintained the king's peace, collected royal revenue, and commanded the shire's military forces. 

There were two methods used to start court proceedings. In one, the alleged victim made an accusation (criminal appeal) that was formally denied by the accused. The second was through frankpledge—a system of self-policing in which every man belonged to a tithing and was sworn to report crimes on pain of amercement. As there were no judges or juries, cases were judged by the suitors (those required to attend the court), particularly the thegns. In disputes over land, courts could use charters and local knowledge as evidence. 

But in other cases, there often were no witnesses or evidence, only neighborhood suspicion. In these instances, the accused swore a holy oath to his innocence and could invite oath-helpers to swear similar oaths if he was considered untrustworthy. In the Christian society of Anglo-Saxon England, a false oath was a grave offense against God and could endanger one's immortal soul. If the accused swore his innocence and gathered the required number of oath-helpers, then he was acquitted. If he was not believed or was unable to gather oath-helpers, then divine judgment was appealed to by means of trial by ordeal (most commonly ordeal by hot water, cold water or hot iron). A trial by ordeal was overseen by the church.

In addition to these local courts, private courts also existed. In the Anglo-Saxon period, the king created private courts in two ways. First, the king could grant the church (either the bishop of a diocese or the abbot of a religious house) the right to administer a hundred. The hundred's reeve would then answer to the bishop or abbot and the hundred court would become an ecclesiastical court. The same cases would be tried as before, but the profits of justice would now go to the church. The second way was to grant by writ or charter special rights to a landowner termed sake and soke. This was the right to hold a court with jurisdiction over his own lands, including infangthief (the power to punish thieves).
  
Cases involving the king, royal property, or treason were judged by the king. People could also appeal decisions from lower courts to the king. By the 9th century, the idea of the king's peace was taking shape. Under this concept, crimes such as murder, treason, arson, and theft were under the exclusive jurisdiction of the king's courts. Compensation was replaced by more severe penalties, including mutilation (blinding or castration) and capital punishment.

Feudal monarchy (1066–1216)

Norman government 

After the Norman Conquest of 1066, England's old Anglo-Saxon rulers were replaced with an Anglo-Norman aristocracy, and English feudalism, which first appeared in the Anglo-Saxon period, continued to develop under Norman influence. William the Conqueror claimed ownership of all land in England. As a feudal lord, the king gave fiefs to his most important followers, his tenants-in-chief (the barons), who in return owed the king fealty and military service (or scutage payments). The king was also entitled to be paid feudal reliefs by his barons on certain occasions, such as the knighting of an eldest son, marriage of an eldest daughter, or upon inheriting a fief. Likewise, barons owed feudal aids when the king's eldest son was knighted or eldest daughter married.

Tenants-in-chief would then grant land to their own vassals in return for homage and fealty. At the end of this chain of subinfeudation was the knight's fee, an estate large enough to support one knight. In return, the knight owed forty days of military service per year. Besides knight-service, other forms of feudal land tenure included serjeanty and frankalmoign. If a lord failed to uphold his responsibilities to his vassals (to protect his vassals and exercise his feudal rights fairly and justly), a vassal was entitled to renounce his homage and fealty through the ritual act of defiance known as diffidation (Latin ) followed by rebellion. Rebellion against the king, therefore, was not treason.

It was where he received counsel, heard complaints and petitions, settled important lawsuits, and conducted state trials. The king's closest friends and advisers from among the aristocracy were his familiares. Councils were important venues for building consensus for royal policy. As Norman kings spent most of their time in Normandy, it became necessary to appoint agents to govern England in their absence. The chief justiciar functioned as the king's chief minister and viceroy with particular responsibility over financial and legal matters.

The chapel—led by the chancellor—served the king's spiritual and secretarial needs. Subordinate to the chancellor was the master of the writing office (or chancery) who supervised the clerks who wrote various government documents: letters, charters, writs, surveys, and rolls. The chamber was the main financial office within the king's government and also saw to the king's personal needs. The chamber was led by the master chamberlain (Latin ), lesser chamberlains, and other officials. Also included in the chamber was a treasurer and two chamberlains based at the treasury in Winchester—the treasury split completely from the chamber by the end of the 12th century.

The constabulary-marshalsea constituted the outdoor staff (including a large number of hunting officials) under the authority of the constables and master-marshal. These officers also supervised the knights of the royal household, who formed the backbone of the king's army. Others were younger sons forced to make their own way in the world.

Under Henry I, the Exchequer developed to bring the various departments under a central auditing and accounting process, as it included officials from the treasury, the chancellor, and other officials of the royal household. As described in the Dialogus de Scaccario, the Exchequer audited the accounts of sheriffs and other royal officials twice a year. Summaries of these audits were recorded in the Pipe Roll. When disputes arose over financial rights and obligations, the Exchequer could also function as a court, the Court of the Exchequer.

Sheriffs remained in charge of royal administration in the counties (formerly shires), presiding over a hierarchy of bailiffs. Early Norman kings chose sheriffs from among the local barons, but Henry I preferred to utilize clerks and knights of the royal household—who owed their success solely to royal patronage. The Normans brought castle building to England, and most shires had a royal castle in the charge of a royally appointed castellan. These were centers of royal administration and the location of royal mints.

Hundred and county courts, presided over by the sheriff or his bailiff, continued to meet as they had before the Conquest. Most disputes in these courts concerned land claims, violence, or theft. Certain cases called pleas of the Crown could only be heard by the king or his representative. So that royal pleas could be heard across the kingdom, the chief justiciar sent itinerant judges out to the counties; however, these royal judges did not decide cases as that was still the responsibility of the suitors to the court, who were overwhelmingly landowners.

The laws concerned with royal forests (i.e. royal hunting preserves) were adjudicated by forest courts, and jurisdiction over cases involving marriage, wills, legitimacy, and crimes committed by clerics were transferred to church courts. The lord of a manor automatically enjoyed the right to hold a manorial court—a departure from Anglo-Saxon tradition, which required royal grant to have sake and soke. Manorial courts had jurisdiction over "debt under forty shillings, contracts and conventions made within the power of the lord, cattle wounding [and other sorts of things], damage to crops by animals, assault not leading to bloodshed, trespass or damaging of timber where the king's peace was not involved, and actions about land by writ of right up to the stage of their removal to the king's court for the grand assize."

Angevin government 

Henry II, England's first Angevin king, introduced a new form of legislation, the assize. An assize was an agreement between the king and his feudal tenants to clarify or alter existing custom. Examples of such legislation include the Assize of Arms of 1181 and the Assize of Bread and Ale.

Other assizes introduced legal reforms. The Assize of Clarendon was an important step in the development of trial by jury. When itinerant judges came to a county, juries of presentment were to identify those "accused or notoriously suspect of being a robber, murderer or thief". The jury developed as a body of local men whose job was to investigate, collect evidence, and come to a verdict. Unlike oath-helpers, jurors were summoned by royal officials and, in theory, would have no personal involvement in the case. Innocence or guilt would be proven by ordeal or trial by battle (introduced by the Normans). Itinerant judges traveled from county to county on general eyres (circuits) to hear pleas of the Crown. By 1189, there were around thirty-five itinerant judges, seven to nine judges per circuit. These royal judges did not merely preside over the court, but "From 1176 the royal justices in eyre made judgments themselves in what was a local session of a national royal court."

In civil cases, such as land disputes, the Grand Assize of 1179 gave defendants the option of having the matter settled by a jury of twelve knights instead of trial by battle. Henry also introduced the petty assizes—procedures to allow speedy resolution of land disputes. These include novel disseisin, mort d'ancestor, and darrein presentment. Henry's reforms mark the origins of the common law and reduced the importance of non-royal courts by making royal justice readily available.

Henry II's expansion of royal justice led to other important changes. Previously, important cases were head  (Latin for "in the presence of the king himself"). The Court of King's Bench was concerned with pleas of the Crown. The Court of Common Pleas had jurisdiction over cases involving private parties (such as debts, property rights and trespass).

Traditionally, the great council was not involved in levying taxes. Royal finances derived from land revenues, feudal aids and incidents, and the profits of royal justice. But this changed due to the levying of extraordinary taxation to finance the Third Crusade, ransom Richard I, and pay for the series of Anglo-French wars fought between the Plantagenet and Capetian dynasties. In 1188, Henry II set a precedent when he applied to the great council for consent to levy the Saladin tithe on land and movable property.

The burden imposed by extraordinary taxation and the likelihood of resistance made consent politically necessary. It was convenient for kings to present the great council of magnates as a representative body capable of consenting on behalf of all within the kingdom. But this development also created more conflict between kings and the baronage as the latter attempted to defend what they considered the rights belonging to the king's subjects.

Under the Angevins, royal government was capable of functioning even with the king's absence, as demonstrated during the reign of Richard I who spent most of it in the Holy Land on Crusade or as a hostage of Holy Roman Emperor Henry VI. Before going on Crusade, Richard divided England into two justiciarships. The chancellor William Longchamp, Bishop of Ely, was made justiciar south of the River Trent and Hugh de Puiset, Bishop of Durham, justiciar in the north. Longchamp managed to become sole justiciar by June 1190, but his authoritarian rule alienated the baronage.

Longchamp was deposed by a cabal of barons and bishops led by Walter of Coutances, Archbishop of Rouen, who acted under instructions from Richard. Going beyond the king's instructions, the magnates declared that Richard's brother John Lackland would be regent and heir if the king was to die childless and appointed Coutances the new justiciar. This was the first time that the magnates removed a royal minister and replaced him with someone else not personally chosen by the king. It was also the first time an heir was named who had not been chosen by the king; in fact, Richard had declared that his nephew, Arthur of Brittany, was to be his heir.

Magna Carta 

King John needed large amounts of money to recover the lost continental possessions of the Angevin Empire, and his extortionate use of scutage, fines and amercements provoked baronial opposition. In 1215, about forty barons rose in revolt. A larger group of barons—around one hundred—worked with Stephen Langton, Archbishop of Canterbury, to mediate a compromise that ultimately became the Magna Carta. This was a charter of liberties that expressed what the barons believed to be their customary feudal rights. Magna Carta was based on three assumptions important to later constitutional development:

 the king was subject to the law
 the king could only make law and raise taxation (except customary feudal dues) with the consent of the community of the realm
 that the obedience owed by subjects to the king was conditional and not absolute

While the clause stipulating no taxation "without the common counsel" was deleted from later reissues, it was nevertheless adhered to by later kings. Magna Carta transformed the magnates' feudal obligation to advise the king into a right to consent. While it was the barons who made the charter, the liberties guaranteed within it were granted to "all the free men of our realm". None of the charter's provisions applied to the unfree serfs that formed a majority of the English population.

Magna Carta was a paradox, as highlighted by constitutional scholar Ann Lyon:Later kings would reconfirm Magna Carta, and later versions were enshrined in law. Overtime, Magna Carta gained the status of "fundamental statute". The first three clauses have never been repealed:

 the English Church shall be free, and shall have its rights undiminished, and its liberties unimpaired;
 the city of London shall enjoy all its ancient liberties and free customs … all other cities, boroughs, towns and ports shall enjoy all their liberties and free customs;
 to no one will we sell, to no one deny or delay right or justice.

Parliamentary monarchy (1216–1399) 
By 1237, the  had formally split into two separate councils; though, they had long been separate in practice. The king's council was "permanent, advisory, and executive". It managed day to day government and included the king's ministers and closest advisers. It met occasionally when summoned by the king. Parliament differed from the older magnate council by being "an institution of the community rather than the crown". For the community of the realm, "it acts as representative, approaching the government from without, and 'parleying' with the king and his council".

Before 1258, legislation was not a major part of parliamentary business. The two major forms of legislation were enacted outside of Parliament. The first form, legislative , were administrative orders drafted by the king's council and issued as letters patent or letters close. The second form, writs, were drafted by the chancery and issued in response to particular court cases. Technically, new writs needed consent from Parliament as much as other forms of legislation, but this was not always sought.

Parliament successfully asserted for itself the right to consent to taxation, and a pattern developed in which the king would make concessions (such as reaffirming Magna Carta) in return for grants of taxation. This was its main tool in disputes with the king. Nevertheless, this proved ineffective at restraining the king as he was still able to raise lesser amounts of revenue from sources that did not require parliamentary consent:

 county farms (the fixed sum paid annually by sheriffs for the privilege of administering and profiting from royal lands in their counties)
 profits from the eyre
 tallage on the royal demesne, the towns, foreign merchants, and most importantly English Jews
 scutage
 feudal dues and fines
 profits from wardship, escheat, and vacant episcopal sees

Henry III and his ministers 
Henry III was still a child when he became king, so the magnates drew partly on the precedent of Richard I's reign to appoint a regent. William Marshal, 1st Earl of Pembroke and hereditary Lord Marshal, was given the title  (Latin for "governor of the king and of the kingdom") until his death in 1219. The regency ended in 1223 when the king was declared of age.

After the death of Marshal, the government was led by a succession of chief ministers, first Hubert de Burgh (1219–1232) and then Peter des Rosches (1232–1234). Both of these ministers alienated the baronage by their accumulation of power and wealth for themselves and their families, ultimately leading to their removal from power. Rosches was particularly hated for his revival of many of King John's tyrannical practices.

Appointing ministers was traditionally a royal prerogative, but a precedent had been established by Henry's regency government of seeking the consent of the magnates. With their links to the magnates and established traditions and procedures, the great offices had functioned as a check on royal power. Under Rosches, the Crown adopted a policy of subordinating the great offices (justiciar, chancellor, treasurer) to the offices of the royal household (chamberlain, keeper of the Wardrobe).

The chief justiciarship lost most of its powers and was reduced to supervising the judiciary. The office was left vacant after Stephen de Segrave was dismissed in 1234. In 1238, the Lord Chancellor Ralph Neville was deprived of the great seal, which was entrusted to Wardrobe clerks. After Neville's death, the seal was entrusted to keepers and the chancellorship remained vacant. With the great seal in Henry's custody, "the king was relieved of all constraint save such as the more elastic methods of his domestic clerks might impose".

After 1240, the king's closest counselors were foreigners—Queen Eleonor's Savoyard relatives and Henry's Lusignan half-brothers. Among the barons, an opposition party formed to oppose a royal government controlled by foreigners.

Baronial reform movement 

By 1258, the relationship between the king and the baronage had reached a breaking point. At the Oxford Parliament of 1258, reform-minded barons forced a reluctant king to accept a constitutional framework known as the Provisions of Oxford:
 The king was to govern according to the advice of an elected council of fifteen barons.
 The baronial council appointed royal ministers (justiciar, treasurer, chancellor) to serve for one-year terms.
 Parliament met three times a year on the octave of Michaelmas (October 6), Candlemas (February 3), and June 1.
 The barons elected twelve representatives (two bishops, one earl and nine barons) who together with the baronial council could act on legislation and other matters even when Parliament was not in session as "a kind of standing parliamentary committee".

Parliament now met regularly according to a schedule rather than at the pleasure of the king. The reformers hoped that the provisions would ensure parliamentary approval for all major government acts. Under the provisions, Parliament was "established formally (and no longer merely by custom) as the voice of the community". 

The king defeated the reform party in the Second Barons' War, and the Provisions of the Oxford were overturned. But the reign of Henry III was "the beginnings of the transition from the king as an absolute and in a sense dictatorial ruler, to the concept of the king ruling through institutions, and of his ruling only while he retained the trust and confidence of his people."

Edwardian government 

Edward I learned from the failures of his father's reign the usefulness of Parliament for building consensus and strengthening royal authority. Parliaments were held regularly throughout his reign, generally twice a year at Easter in the spring and after Michaelmas in the autumn. 

Parliaments handled a large amount of petitions and judicial business. The first major statutes amending the common law were passed, beginning with the Statute of Westminster in 1275. These laws, however, "were not  by the King in Parliament, but simply announced by the king or his ministers in a parliament." At the same time, the king continued to legislate outside of Parliament through ordinances and writs.

Feudalism had declined as the organising principle of political life. The shires and boroughs were recognised as communes (Latin ) with a unified constituency capable of being represented by knights of the shire and burgesses in Parliament.

Edward's legal reforms established the foundation of English land law, which was not significantly altered until 1925. For example, the Statute of Westminster of 1285 allowed for the creation of entails. Royal control over non-royal courts was also increased; the writ of  limited the jurisdiction of ecclesiastical courts to attacks on clerics and matrimonial, testamentary, and moral concerns.

As part of the 1267 Treaty of Montgomery, Henry III had recognised Llywelyn ap Gruffudd as Prince of Wales in return for Llywelyn's homage and fealty. When the Prince refused to attend Parliament to do homage, Edward invaded Wales in 1276 and by 1283 had completed the conquest of Wales. The Statute of Wales created as system of shires for northern Wales that were overseen by the Justiciar of North Wales. English criminal law was imposed, but Welsh law continued to apply in other areas of life (see Principality of Wales).

The Ordinances of 1311 were a series of regulations imposed on King Edward II by the Lords and higher clergy to restrict the power of the king.

Throughout the middle ages, common land was a source of welfare for common people, peasant labourers bound by a feudal system of control. In 1348, the Black Death struck England, and killed around a third of the population. As peasants lost their lords, and there was a shortage of workers, wages rose. The King and Parliament responded with the Statute of Labourers 1351 to freeze wage rises. This led to the Peasants’ Revolt of 1381, where leaders demanded an end to feudalism, and for everything to be held in common. Despite the revolt’s violent repression, slavery and serfdom broke down, yet most people remained without any substantial liberty, in political or economic rights.

As sheep farming became more profitable than agricultural work, enclosures of common land dispossessed more people, who turned into paupers and were punished.

Tudor dynasty 
Under Henry VIII, to seal a divorce from Catherine of Aragon and marry Anne Boleyn (who he soon beheaded for supposed infidelity), the Church of England was declared separate from Rome in the Act of Supremacy 1534, with the King as the head. The Law in Wales Act 1535 united Wales and England in one administrative system, while the King became ever more despotic, executing the Lord Chancellor, Sir Thomas More in 1535, and dissolving the monasteries and murdering those who resisted. After Henry VIII died, and power struggles following the death of his boy Edward VI at age 15, Elizabeth I, the daughter of Henry VIII and Anne Boleyn, took the throne in 1558. Half a century of prosperity followed as Elizabeth I largely avoided wars.

A second Act of Supremacy 1559 restored powers over the church to Elizabeth I, reversing Mary I's catholic laws, and required all office-holders including the clergy to take an oath of allegiance acknowledging the Queen as the supreme governor of the Church of England. After the Spanish Armada was defeated in 1588,  Its two levels of administration were the House of Lords, composed of influential peers of the realm and Lords Spiritual, and the House of Commons, which consisted of representative members of the aristocracy and the middle-class.  Puritans in the House of Commons began demanding more rights, but their demands were ignored. James I would later have problems with them.

Before 1600, the Crown founded corporations including the East India Company to monopolise trade routes. Under her successor, James I, further companies were created to colonise North America, including the London Company and the Virginia Company in 1606, and the Massachusetts Bay Company in 1628. Many religious dissidents left England to settle the new world.

Stuart dynasty 

While Elizabeth I maintained a protestant Church, under her successor James, who unified the Scottish and English Crowns, religious and political tensions grew as he asserted a divine right of Kings. In 1605, Guy Fawkes attempted to blow up Parliament, but was caught, tortured and executed. A wave of repression against catholics followed. James acceded to Puritan requests by commissioning the "King James Bible" in 1604, an English language translation and interpretation of the Bible completed in 1611. Possibly persuaded by his (secretly Catholic) wife, James exempted Catholics from paying tithes to the Anglican Church, but this caused a great decrease in Anglican Church revenue, so he quickly took those rights away.

The assertion of divine right prompted a series of cases from Sir Edward Coke, the Chief Justice of the Common Pleas and then King's Bench courts, which denied that the King could pass judgment in legal proceedings, and held that the royal prerogative was subject to the law and cannot be expanded. Coke CJ went even further in Dr Bonham's case, holding that even that "the common law will control Acts of Parliament". Though supported by some judges, the idea that common law courts could nullify Acts of Parliament was rejected, and the common law was formally placed under the King's control in the Earl of Oxford’s case, establishing that equity (then administered by the Lord Chancellor in the House of Lords) was above common law. Coke fell from favour, and was removed from judicial office.

Traditionally, Parliament had voted at the beginning of a King's reign on the amount allowed for a King's Tonnage and Poundage, the customs duties (taxes on imported goods like wool and wine) that made up a large portion of a king's annual income. Now Parliament wanted to re-evaluate these taxes annually, which would give it more control over the king. James I resisted this abrogation of his 'Divine Right' and dealt with the situation by dissolving Parliament. Charles I did the same at first and later just ignored its annual evaluations.

When Charles I succeeded to the throne in 1625, and more fervently asserted a divine right, including the ability to levy tax without Parliament, particularly a Ship Money tax that required the counties bordering the sea to fund a navy to protect the English coastline. The coastal counties were unhappy as it was not actually used to fund the navy. Charles then placed the Ship Money tax on the interior counties as well. A London MP named John Hampden refused to pay this "new," interior Ship Money tax, so he was tried for a crime by Charles I and was convicted with a vote of 7 to 5. This meant that 5 of 12 jurors were against their king, which did not look good or bode well for Charles I. Coke and others presented the Petition of Right 1628. This demanded the King to abide by Magna Carta, levy no tax without Parliament, not arbitrarily commit people to prison, not have martial law in times of peace, and not billet soldiers in private homes. As Charles I was at war with France and Spain, he signed the Petition of Right, but then responded by shutting down or proroguing Parliament and taxing trade (or "ship money") without authority.

The country descended into the English Civil War in 1642 culminating in the capture and execution of King Charles I on Whitehall in 1649 by the New Model Army led by Oliver Cromwell. Cromwell, not wishing to become a King, became a de facto dictator. After his death, the monarchy was restored with Charles II in 1660, but his successor James II again attempted to assert divine right to rule. In 1688, Parliament 'invited' a replacement King and Queen, William and Mary of Orange, and after a brief conflict forced Charles II out. 

Known as the Glorious Revolution, Parliament proclaimed a new Bill of Rights 1689, with a Claim of Right Act 1689 in Scotland, that cemented Parliamentary sovereignty. As well as reaffirming Magna Carta, it says the 'pretended power of suspending laws or the execution of laws by regal authority without consent of Parliament is illegal’, that 'election of members of Parliament ought to be free’, and that 'Parliament ought to be held frequently'. The justification for government itself, encapsulated by John Locke in his Second Treatise on Government was the protection of people's rights: "lives, liberties and estates."

Civil War 
William Laud and Thomas Wentworth were appointed to fill the void that the Duke of Buckingham left. On top of the wars England had with France and with Spain (both caused by the Duke of Buckingham), Charles I and William Laud (the Archbishop of Canterbury) began a war with Scotland in an attempt to convert Scotland to the Church of England (the Anglican Church). This was called the Bishops' War (1639–1640) and it had two major parts: The first Bishops' War (1639) ended in a truce. The second Bishops' War, the following year, began with the a Scottish invasion of England in which the Scottish defeated the English and remained stationed in England until their issues were solved. To get the Scottish out, Charles I signed the Treaty of Ripon (1640), which required England to pay an indemnity of £850 for each day that the Scottish were stationed in England.

During the second part of the Bishops' War, Charles I had run very low on money (since he was also fighting France and Spain), so he was forced to call a Parliament to make new taxes. He and the Parliament could not agree on anything, so after three weeks, Charles I dissolved the Parliament. Then he desperately needed new taxes, so Charles I called a Parliament again and it would only help him if he agreed to some terms, which ultimately made Charles I a constitutional monarch. It was called the Long Parliament (1640–1660), because it was not officially dissolved by its own vote until 1660.

These terms were:
 That Charles I had to impeach Thomas Wentworth and William Laud. He reluctantly placed them under arrest and put them in The Tower, executing Wentworth in 1641 (for which Charles I never forgave himself since he was close to Thomas Wentworth) and William Laud in 1645.
 Charles I had to agree to the Triennial Act (1641), which required the Parliament to meet every three years with or without the king's consent.
 Charles I had to abolish the Court of the Star Chamber, a royal court controlled completely by Charles I in which the prosecutor was also the judge (which pretty much guaranteed a guilty verdict for the defendant) and it was intended to be used to implement the will of the king legally with a "judicial" façade. It was considered an "extralegal" court. It dealt with odd cases and punishments.
 Charles I had to abolish the High Court, which was the same as the Court of the Star Chamber, though it dealt with religious heresy. It was considered an "extralegal" court.
 Charles I had to accept the Grand Remonstrance and allow the circulation of its copies, and it was a document that outlined (hyperbolically) the crimes that officials had accused Charles of committing since the beginning of his reign. Charles I was also never to do any of those crimes again.
 Charles I, most importantly, had to agree never to dissolve a Parliament without the consent of the Parliament.

Most of England believed that Parliament had done enough to curb the power of King Charles I, but the radicals in Parliament (the extremist Puritans) and the radicals around the country (again, extremist Puritans) wanted to reform the Church of England by getting rid of the bishops (and all other things with the semblance of Catholicism) and by establishing the Puritans' method of worship as the standard. This caused a political division in Parliament, so Charles I took advantage of it. He then sent 500 soldiers into the House of Commons to arrest five of the Puritans' ringleaders (John Hampden included). The five ringleaders had been tipped off, so they had left Parliament and Charles I was left with only shame for storming Parliament.

King Charles I left London and went to Oxford, and the English Civil War began (1642). The North and West of England were on Charles I's side (along with most of the Nobles and country gentry). They were known as the Cavaliers. Charles I created an army illegally (since he needed the Parliament's consent).

The South and East of England were on Parliament's side and were known as Roundheads, for their haircuts. In response to Charles I raising an army, they did so as well. Yet, they didn't have the military might that King Charles I (and his nobles) had, so they solicited the help of the Scottish with the Solemn League and Covenant that promised to impose the Presbyterian religion on the Church of England. They called their army the New Model Army and they made its commander Oliver Cromwell, who was also a member of Parliament. The New Model Army was composed mostly of Presbyterians.

Cromwell and Commonwealth 
Though Parliament won, it was clear to the Scots that it was not going to uphold the Solemn League and Covenant by imposing Presbyterianism on England (Puritanism wasn't quite Presbyterian), so the New Model Army, Parliament and the Scots began falling apart. The Scots were paid for their help and sent back to Scotland.

The Presbyterian Roundheads were interested in freedom to practice their religion and not in making the Presbyterian religion the state religion.

Cromwell proposed that Parliament reinstate the bishops of the Church of England and King Charles I as a constitutional monarch, but allow for the toleration of other religions. Though at the end of the war, the people of England could accept Charles I back in office but not religious toleration. They also wanted the New Model Army dissolved since it was a provocative factor. Thus Parliament disallowed religious toleration and voted to disband the New Model Army, but the New Model Army refused the order.

Charles I then made the same deal that the Roundheads had made with the Scottish and Parliamentary Presbyterians. He solicited the help of Scotland (and the Presbyterians) and in return he promised to impose Presbyterianism on England. The New Model Army would not allow this deal to be made (because it would give Charles I military power once more). Thus a "new" civil war broke out in 1648.

This time, Scotland, the Parliamentary Presbyterians and the royalists were on the side of Charles I. The New Model Army and the rest of Parliament were against him.

In the Battle of Preston (1648) Cromwell and his New Model Army defeated Charles I.

Then one of Cromwell's officers, Colonel Pride, destroyed the Presbyterian majority in Parliament by driving out of Parliament 143 Presbyterians of the 203 (leaving behind 60). The new Parliament constituted a Rump Parliament, which was a Parliament in which the minority (Presbyterians) carried on in the name of the majority that was kicked out. The Rump Parliament:
Abolished the monarchy and the House of Lords in Parliament (it then executed Charles I after publicly trying him for crimes).
Created a republic called the "Commonwealth" that was really just a dictatorship run by Cromwell.

Scotland was against Cromwell's "Commonwealth" (Republic) and declared Charles I's son king at Edinburgh as King Charles II, but Cromwell and the New Model Army defeated him (1650) and he fled to France where he stayed until 1660.

Cromwell then went to Ireland to govern it, but was "disgusted" with the Catholics, so he massacred many of them (in battle) and so the Irish rebelled against him as well. Cromwell then dissolved the Rump Parliament and declared himself to be the Lord Protector (dictator).

Cromwell died (1658) and was succeeded by his son Richard Cromwell, who tried to keep power militarily and absolutely, but he was also incapable of unifying all of the diverse groups (religious and ethnic). General George Monk came down from Scotland and overthrew Richard. He then invited the remnants of the Long Parliament (the Rump Parliament) to reconvene. The Long Parliament met and officially ended (in 1660, after being open since 1640) when it voted to dissolve itself and create a new Parliament. The new Parliament began the Restoration (of the monarchy) by choosing Charles I's son Charles II to be the King of England.

Popular political movements 
The idea of a political party with factions took form around the time of the Civil War. Soldiers from the Parliamentarian New Model Army and a faction of Levellers freely debated rights to political representation during the Putney Debates of 1647. The Levellers published a newspaper (The Moderate) and pioneered political petitions, pamphleteering and party colours. Later, the pre-war Royalist (then Cavalier) and opposing Parliamentarian groupings became the Tory party and the Whigs in the Parliament.

In 1649 Diggers, a small people's political reform movement, published The True Levellers Standard Advanced: or, The State of Community opened, and Presented to the Sons of Men. This is another important document in the history of British constitutionalism, though different from the others listed here because the Diggers' declaration comes from the people instead of from the state. They are some times called "True Levellers" to distinguish themselves from the larger political group called the Levellers, which had supported the republicans during the civil war. The Diggers were not satisfied with what had been gained by the war against the king and wanted instead a dismantling of the state. They can be best understood through such philosophies as libertarianism, anarchism, and religious communism.

Also at this time, the Polish Brethren arrived in England and Holland. The sect of Polish Brethren had been driven out of Poland after The Deluge because they were commonly considered to be collaborators with the Swedish.

The Diggers' radical ideas influenced thinkers in Poland, Holland, and England, playing an especially important role in the philosophy of John Locke.  Locke, in turn, profoundly impacted the development of political ideas regarding liberty, which would later influence the Founding Fathers of the United States.

The Glorious Revolution was the overthrow of James II in 1688 and his replacement with William III and Mary II as joint monarchs. The Convention Parliament of 1689 drew up a Declaration of Right to address perceived abuses of government under James II and to secure the religion and liberties of Protestants. This was enacted by the Parliament of England as the Bill of Rights 1689, which limited royal power and reaffirmed certain civil rights, building on the  Petition of Right 1628 and the Habeas Corpus Act 1679. The Parliament of Scotland approved it as the Claim of Right.

Both the Bill of Rights and the Claim of Right contributed a great deal to the establishment of the concept of parliamentary sovereignty and the curtailment of the powers of the monarch. Leading, ultimately, to the establishment of constitutional monarchy. They furthered the protection of the rule of law, which had started to become a principle of the way the country is governed.

Wales 
Under the Statute of Wales, English criminal law replaced Welsh law in 1284. English civil law was imposed on Wales by Henry VIII's series of Laws in Wales Acts between 1535 and 1542. The Laws in Wales Acts formally incorporated all of Wales within the Kingdom of England.

The Encyclopaedia of Wales notes that the Council of Wales and the Marches was created by Edward IV in 1471 as a household institution to manage the Prince of Wales's lands and finances. In 1473, it was enlarged and given the additional duty of maintaining law and order in the Principality and the Marches of Wales. Its meetings appear to have been intermittent, but it was revived by Henry VII for his heir, Prince Arthur. The Council was placed on a statutory basis in 1543 and played a central role in co-ordinating law and administration. It declined in the early 17th century and was abolished by Parliament in 1641. It was revived at the Restoration before being finally abolished in 1689.

From 1689 to 1948 there was no differentiation between the government of England and government in Wales. All laws relating to England included Wales and Wales was considered by the British Government as an indivisible part of England within the United Kingdom. The first piece of legislation to relate specifically to Wales was the Sunday Closing (Wales) Act 1881.  A further exception was the Welsh Church Act 1914, which disestablished the Church in Wales (which had formerly been part of the Church of England) in 1920.

In 1948 the practice was established that all laws passed in the Parliament of the United Kingdom were designated as applicable to either "England and Wales" or "Scotland", thus returning a legal identity to Wales which had not existed for hundreds of years following the Act of Union with Scotland in 1707. Also in 1948 a new Council for Wales was established as a parliamentary committee. In 1964 the Welsh Office was established, based in London, to oversee and recommend improvements to the application of laws in Wales. This situation would continue until the devolution of government in Wales and the establishment of the autonomous National Assembly for Wales in 1998.

Kingdom of Scotland

From the fifth century AD, north Britain was divided into a series of petty kingdoms. Ferocious Viking raids beginning in AD 793 may have speeded up a long-term process of gaelicisation of the Pictish kingdoms, which adopted Gaelic language and customs. There was also a merger of the Gaelic and Pictish kingdoms. This culminated in the rise of Cínaed mac Ailpín (Kenneth MacAlpin) as "king of the Picts" in the 840s (traditionally dated to 843), which brought to power the House of Alpin. When he died as king of the combined kingdom in 900 one of his successors, Domnall II (Donald II), was the first man to be called rí Alban (King of Alba). 

The term Scotia was increasingly used to describe the heartland of these kings, north of the River Forth. Eventually the entire area controlled by its kings was referred to as Scotland. The long reign (900–942/3) of Donald's successor Causantín (Constantine II) is often regarded as the key to formation of the Kingdom of Alba/Scotland. He was later credited with bringing Scottish Christianity into conformity with the Catholic Church.

Máel Coluim I (Malcolm I) (reigned c. 943–954) annexed Strathclyde, over which the kings of Alba had probably exercised some authority since the later ninth century. The reign of David I has been characterised as a "Davidian Revolution", in which he introduced a system of feudal land tenure, established the first royal burghs in Scotland and the first recorded Scottish coinage, and continued a process of religious and legal reforms.

Government

The unified kingdom of Alba retained some of the ritual aspects of Pictish and Scottish kingship. These can be seen in the elaborate ritual coronation at the Stone of Scone at Scone Abbey.

While the Scottish monarchy in the Middle Ages was a largely itinerant institution, Scone remained one of its most important locations, with royal castles at Stirling and Perth becoming significant in the later Middle Ages before Edinburgh developed as a capital city in the second half of the fifteenth century.

The Crown remained the most important element of government, despite the many royal minorities. In the late Middle Ages, it saw much of the aggrandisement associated with the New Monarchs elsewhere in Europe. Theories of constitutional monarchy and resistance were articulated by Scots, particularly George Buchanan, in the sixteenth century, but James VI of Scotland advanced the theory of the divine right of kings, and these debates were restated in subsequent reigns and crises.  The court remained at the centre of political life, and in the sixteenth century emerged as a major centre of display and artistic patronage, until it was effectively dissolved with the Union of the Crowns in 1603.

The Scottish Crown adopted the conventional offices of western European courts, including High Steward, Chamberlain, Lord High Constable, Earl Marischal and Lord Chancellor. The King's Council emerged as a full-time body in the fifteenth century, increasingly dominated by laymen and critical to the administration of justice. The Privy Council, which developed in the mid-sixteenth century, and the great offices of state, including the chancellor, secretary and treasurer, remained central to the administration of the government, even after the departure of the Stuart monarchs to rule in England from 1603. However, it was often sidelined and was abolished after the Acts of Union 1707, with rule direct from London.

The Parliament of Scotland also emerged as a major legal institution, gaining an oversight of taxation and policy. By the end of the Middle Ages it was sitting almost every year, partly because of the frequent royal minorities and regencies of the period, which may have prevented it from being sidelined by the monarchy. In the early modern era, Parliament was also vital to the running of the country, providing laws and taxation, but it had fluctuating fortunes and was never as central to the national life as its counterpart in England.

In the early period the kings of the Scots depended on the great lords of the mormaers (later earls) and toísechs (later thanes), but from the reign of David I, sheriffdoms were introduced, which allowed more direct control and gradually limited the power of the major lordships. In the seventeenth century the creation of justices of the peace and the Commissioner of Supply helped to increase the effectiveness of local government. The continued existence of courts baron and introduction of kirk sessions helped consolidate the power of local lairds.

United Kingdom development

With Parliamentary sovereignty as the cornerstone of the new constitution, Parliament created a system of finance in the Bank of England Act 1694.

The Act of Settlement 1701 made several important reforms.

 Judges' commissions were for life (during "good behavior"), and a judge could be removed only by vote of both Houses of Parliament. (Previously,  a judge served at the discretion of the Crown.)
 No person holding a paid office under the Crown or receiving a pension from the Crown could serve in the House of Commons.
 No Catholic, or spouse of a Catholic, could ever succeed to the Crown of England.
 The King or Queen of England must practice the Anglican religion.
 The succession to the Crown of England was settled on the nearest Protestant relatives of King William III and his expected successor Anne, who were childless. These were Electress Sophia of Hanover, and her son, who in 1714 succeeded as King George I.

In 1703, Ashby v White established that the right to vote was a constitutional right.

In April 1706, Scottish and English representatives began negotiations for union at Whitehall. The English proposed a combined parliament, to which Scotland would send 38 MPs and 16 peers, elected by Scottish peers at every new parliament. After the Scottish successfully negotiated an extra seven MPs, the proposals were brought before Queen Anne. The vote passed the Scottish Parliament 110 votes to 69 on 16 January 1707. The Acts of Union 1707 were passed by the English and Scottish Parliaments separately and on 1 May 1707, the two countries became formally united as Great Britain (though one view holds that as a matter of international law, Great Britain was a successor state of England). This created a new parliament called the Parliament of Great Britain.

The Acts of Union also established a full economic union between England and Scotland. Scotland's separate currency, taxes, and trade regulations were effectively abolished, while Scottish merchants gained complete access to England and its colonies. Scotland retain a separate legal system and judiciary.

The new union was soon faced with disaster as in the War of the Spanish Succession, the Spanish promised the right for British ships to trade (mostly slaves) in the seas around South America. The South Sea Company, duly incorporated to monopolise trade routes, became the object of mass financial speculation, provoked by government ministers interested in its rising share price. When it transpired, contrary to promoters' stories, that no trade was done because the Spanish had revoked their promise the stock market crashed, driving economic chaos. This was made worse by the decision of conservative politicians to endorse the company to take over the national debt as an alternative financier to the government over the Whig dominated Bank of England.

The result of the crash was that the Chancellor of the Exchequer was imprisoned in the Tower of London for his corruption, the Postmaster General committed suicide, and the disgraced Lord Chancellor was replaced with Lord King LC who promptly ruled that people in a position of trust must avoid any possibility of a conflict of interest. Out of the chaos, Robert Walpole emerged as a stable political figure who for 21 years held a majority of the House of Commons, and is now considered the first "Prime Minister". Walpole chaired cabinet meetings, appointed all other ministers, and developed the doctrine of cabinet solidarity.

In 1765, the first teacher of English law, William Blackstone represented the standard view in his Commentaries on the Laws of England that slavery was unlawful and that "the spirit of liberty is so deeply ingrained in our constitution" any person enslaved in England must be freed. However, the transatlantic slave trade had accelerated to North American colonies. In 1772, when Lord Mansfield ruled in Somerset v Stewart that slavery was unlawful at common law, this set off a wave of outrage in southern, plantation colonies of America. Together with northern colonies grievances over taxation without representation, this led to the American Revolution and Declaration of Independence in 1776. The British military failed to hold control. Instead, it began settling Australia from 1788. 

In 1789, the French Revolution broke out, and the King was deposed with demands for "liberty, equality and fraternity". The British aristocracy reacted with repression on free speech and association to forestall any similar movement. While figures like Jeremy Bentham called natural rights "nonsense upon stilts", Mary Wollstonecraft called for A Vindication of the Rights of Woman as well as men, arguing that unjust gender and class oppression flowed from "the respect paid to property... as from a poisoned fountain". While successful in the Napoleonic wars in defeating France, and cementing union with Ireland in the Act of Union 1800, liberty, freedom and democracy were scarcely protected in the new "United Kingdom".

Political and industrial revolution

During this time, with the invention of the steam engine the industrial revolution had begun. Poverty had also accelerated through the Speenhamland system of poor laws by subsidising employers and landowners with parish rates. The Corn Laws from 1815 further impoverished people by fixing prices to maintain landowner profits. While the Great Reform Act 1832 extended the vote slightly, only those with property had any representation in Parliament. Although the Slavery Abolition Act 1833 abolished the slave trade within the British Empire, it only compensated slave owners and made ex-slaves in colonies pay off debts for their freedom for decades after. With the Poor Law Amendment Act 1834, further punishment for poverty was inflicted as people were put into work houses if found to be unemployed. In R v Lovelass a group of agricultural workers who formed a trade union were prosecuted and sentenced to be transported to Australia under the Unlawful Oaths Act 1797, triggering mass protests.

A movement called Chartism grew demanding the right to vote for everyone in free and fair elections. As the great famine hit Ireland and millions migrated to the United States, Chartists staged a mass march from Kennington Common to Parliament in 1848 as revolutions broke out across Europe, and the Communist Manifesto was drafted by German revolutionary Karl Marx and Manchester factory owner Friedrich Engels. While the Crimean War distracted from social reform and Viscount Palmerston opposed anything, the American civil war of 1860 to 1865 ended slavery in the US, and the UK gradually enabled greater political freedom. 

In the Second Reform Act 1867 more middle class property owners were enfranchised, the Elementary Education Act 1870 provided free primary school, and the Trade Union Act 1871 enabled free association without criminal penalty. William Ewart Gladstone's UK Midlothian campaign between 1878-80 began the move towards modern political campaigning. The Representation of the People Act 1884 reduced the property qualification further, so that around one third of men could vote.

Outside the UK liberty and the right to vote were violently repressed across the vast British Empire, in Africa, India, Asia and the Caribbean.

Social reform and war

From the start of the 20th century, the UK underwent vast social and constitutional change, beginning with an attempt by the House of Lords to suppress trade union freedom. In response, the labour movement organised to support representatives in Parliament, and in the 1906 general election won 29 seats and supported the Liberal Party's programme of reform. This included a legal guarantee of the right of unions to collectively bargain and strike for fair wages, an old age pension, a system of minimum wages, a People's Budget with higher taxes on the wealthy to fund spending. After a further election brought by the House of Lords blocking reform, Parliament pass a National Insurance system for welfare, and the Parliament Act 1911 prevented the House of Lords blocking legislation for more than two years, and removed the right to delay any money bills. 

Despite this, the Liberal government, against the opposition of Labour, armed for and entered World War I. At the end of the War, with millions dead, Parliament passed the Representation of the People Act 1918 which enabled every adult male the vote, although it was only after the mass protest of the Suffragettes that the Representation of the People (Equal Franchise) Act 1928 enabled all women to vote, and that the UK became democratic. The War also triggered uprising in Ireland, and an Irish War of Independence leading to the partition of the island between the Republic of Ireland in the south and Northern Ireland in the Government of Ireland Act 1920. The Versailles Treaty at the end of the War demanded German reparations, beggaring the country through the 1920s and upon the Great Depression leading to a fascist collapse under Hitler.

Irish independence and partition

In 1912, the House of Lords managed to delay a Home Rule bill passed by the House of Commons. It was enacted as the Government of Ireland Act 1914. During these two years the threat of religious civil war hung over Ireland with the creation of the Unionist Ulster Volunteers opposed to the Act and their nationalist counterparts, the Irish Volunteers supporting the Act. The outbreak of World War I in 1914 put the crisis on political hold. A disorganized Easter Rising in 1916 was brutally suppressed by the British, which had the effect of galvanizing Catholic demands for independence.  Prime Minister David Lloyd George failed to introduce Home Rule in 1918 and in the December 1918 General Election Sinn Féin won a majority of Irish seats.

Its MPs refused to take their seats at Westminster, instead choosing to sit in the First Dáil parliament in Dublin. A declaration of independence was ratified by Dáil Éireann, the self-declared Republic's parliament in January 1919. An Anglo-Irish War was fought between Crown forces and the Irish Republican Army between January 1919 and June 1921.  The war ended with the Anglo-Irish Treaty of December 1921 that established the Irish Free State. Six northern, predominantly Protestant counties became Northern Ireland and have remained part of the United Kingdom ever since, despite demands of the Catholic minority to unite with the Republic of Ireland. Britain officially adopted the name "United Kingdom of Great Britain and Northern Ireland"  by the Royal and Parliamentary Titles Act 1927.

Post-war

 

The failed international law system, after World War II was replaced with the United Nations where the UK held a permanent seat on the UN Security Council. However the British Empire began to crumble as India, Israel and nations across Africa fought for democracy, human rights, and independence. To prevent any recurrence of the Holocaust and war, the Council of Europe was established to draft the European Convention on Human Rights in 1950. Further it was seen that the only way to prevent conflict was through economic integration. The European Economic Community, which became the European Union in 1992, was supported by Winston Churchill with the UK to be "at the centre", although it did not enter until the European Communities Act 1972.

Under Margaret Thatcher, significant cuts were made to public services, labour rights, and the powers of local government, including abolishing the Greater London Council. However some powers were restored with extensive devolution of power in the Scotland Act 1998, Northern Ireland Act 1998, Greater London Authority Act 1999 and the Government of Wales Act 2006. After many years of armed conflict in Northern Ireland, the Good Friday Agreement of 1998 brought peace.

The Life Peerages Act 1958 had allowed the creation of life peers which gave the Prime Minister the ability to change the composition of the House of Lords. The House of Lords Act 1999 reduced but did not fully eliminate hereditary peers.

An important change in constitutional law came about with the Fixed-term Parliaments Act 2011, which significantly altered the way in which parliament can be dissolved. Then, following a referendum on EU membership in 2016 that resulted in 52.89 per cent of people favouring to leave, the United Kingdom ceased to be a member of the European Union on 31 January 2020.  The Fixed-term Parliaments Act, which had impeded resolution of the Brexit controversy in Parliament, was subsequently repealed by the Dissolution and Calling of Parliament Act 2022, reverting the constitutional situation to the status quo ante.

Devolution
In the First Blair ministry (1997–2001), Labour introduced a large package of constitutional reforms, which the party had promised in its 1997 manifesto. The most significant were:
The creation of a devolved parliament in Scotland and assemblies in Wales and Northern Ireland, with their own direct elections.
The creation of a devolved assembly in London and the associated post of a directly elected mayor.
The beginning of a process of reform of the House of Lords, including the removal of all but 92 hereditary peers.
The incorporation of the European Convention on Human Rights into UK law by passing the Human Rights Act 1998.
The passing of the Freedom of Information Act 2000.
The passing of the Political Parties, Elections and Referendums Act 2000, creating the Electoral Commission to regulate elections and referendums and party spending to an extent.
The granting of independence over decisions about monetary policy including interest rates to the Bank of England.

The House of Commons voted on seven options in February 2003 on what proportion of elected and appointed members (from 100% elected to 100% appointed) the House of Lords should have. None of the options received a majority.

In 2004, a Joint Committee of the House of Commons and House of Lords tasked with overseeing the drafting of the Civil Contingencies Bill, published its first report, in which, among other things, it suggested amending the bill's clauses that grant Cabinet Ministers the power "to disapply or modify any Act of Parliament" as overly wide, and that the bill should be modified to preclude changes to the following Acts, which, it suggested, formed "the fundamental parts of constitutional law" of the United Kingdom:

This amendment was defeated by the government and the bill was passed without it. However, the government partially one recommendation — the Human Rights Act 1998 may not be amended by emergency regulations.

The Constitutional Reform Act 2005 created the Supreme Court of the United Kingdom and guarantees judicial independence.

Coalition reforms
The Conservative-Liberal Democrat Coalition introduced several reforms including the Constitutional Reform and Governance Act 2010, which reformed the Royal Prerogative and made other significant changes; the Fixed-term Parliaments Act 2011, which introduced fixed-term parliaments of 5 years.

A key Liberal Democrat policy was that of voting reform, to which a referendum took place in May 2011 on whether or not Britain should adopt a system of Alternative Vote to elect MPs to Westminster. However, the proposal was rejected overwhelmingly, with 68% of voters in favour of retaining first-past-the-post.

In late October 2011, the prime ministers of the Commonwealth realms voted to grant gender equality in the line of succession to the British throne, ending male-preference primogeniture. The amendment, once enacted, also ended the ban on the monarch marrying a Catholic. Following the Perth Agreement in 2011, legislation amending the Bill of Rights 1689 and the Act of Settlement 1701 came into effect across the Commonwealth realms on 26 March 2015 which changed the laws of succession to the British throne. In the United Kingdom, it was passed as the Succession to the Crown Act 2013.

Further devolution

Further powers were devolved under the Government of Wales Act 2006, Northern Ireland Act 2006, Northern Ireland Act 2009, Scotland Act 2012, Wales Act 2014, and the Scotland Act 2016. On 18 September, a referendum was held in Scotland on whether to leave the United Kingdom and become an independent country. The three UK-wide political parties - Labour, Conservative and Liberal Democrats - campaigned together as part of the Better Together campaign while the pro-independence Scottish National Party was the main force in the Yes Scotland campaign, together with the Scottish Greens and the Scottish Socialist Party. Days before the vote, with the opinion polls closing, the three Better Together party leaders issued 'The Vow', a promise of more powers for Scotland in the event of a No vote. The referendum resulted in Scotland voting by 55% to 45% to remain part of the United Kingdom.

The Smith Commission was announced by Prime Minister David Cameron on 19 September 2014 to propose the powers that would be devolved to the Scottish Government. Once the recommendations had been published they were debated in the UK Parliament and a command paper was published in January 2015 putting forward draft legislative proposals. A Scottish Parliament committee report published in May 2015 said that this draft bill did not meet the recommendations of the Smith Commission, specifically in relation to welfare payments. A spokesman for the UK Government said that a full Parliamentary discussion would follow. A bill based on the Smith Commission's recommendations was announced by the UK government in the May 2015 Queen's Speech. The bill subsequently became law as the Scotland Act 2016 in March 2016.

Accession to the EU and subsequent withdrawal

On 20 February 2016, Prime Minister David Cameron announced that a referendum on the UK's membership of the European Union would be held on 23 June 2016, following years of campaigning by eurosceptics. Debates and campaigns by parties supporting both "Remain" and "Leave" focused on concerns regarding trade and the single market, security, migration and sovereignty.  The result of the referendum was in favour of the country leaving the EU with 51.9% of voters wanting to leave. The UK remains a member for the time being, but is expected to invoke Article 50 of the Lisbon Treaty, which would begin negotiations on a withdrawal agreement that will last no more than two years (unless the Council and the UK agree to extend the negotiation period) which will ultimately lead to an exit from the European Union.

In October 2016 the prime minister, Theresa May, promised a "Great Repeal Bill" which would repeal the 1972 European Communities Act and import its regulations into UK law, with effect from the date of British withdrawal. The regulations could then be amended or repealed on a case-by-case basis.

The Supreme Court issued a ruling in January 2017 that an Act of Parliament is needed before the government can trigger  to leave the European Union.

Worldwide influence 
Over its history, the British constitution has had widespread influence around the world on the constitutions and legal systems of other countries as well the spread of the principles of the rule of law, parliamentary sovereignty and judicial independence.

Magna Carta and the Parliament of England influenced the history of democracy in the Middle Ages and the early history of parliamentarism. 

In the Thirteen Colonies, the Bill of Rights 1689 was one of the influences on the 1776 Virginia Declaration of Rights, which in turn influenced the United States Declaration of Independence later that year. The Constitution of the United States was adopted in 1789 and the United States Bill of Rights was ratified in 1791, both of which were influenced by British constitutional history.

Although not a comprehensive statement of civil and political liberties, the Bill of Rights 1689 stands as one of the landmark documents in the development of civil liberties in the United Kingdom and a model for later, more general, statements of rights, including the United States Bill of Rights, the French Declaration of the Rights of Man and of the Citizen, the United Nations Universal Declaration of Human Rights, and the European Convention on Human Rights. For example, as with the Bill of Rights 1689, the US Constitution prohibits excessive bail and "cruel and unusual punishment". Similarly, "cruel, inhuman or degrading treatment or punishment" is banned under Article 5 of the Universal Declaration of Human Rights and Article 3 of the European Convention on Human Rights.

The modern system of parliament emerged with the Parliament of Great Britain (1707–1800), which contributed to the spread of parliamentarism in Europe. The British Parliament is often referred to as the Mother of Parliaments (in fact a misquotation of John Bright, who remarked in 1865 that "England is the Mother of Parliaments") because the British Parliament has been the model for most other parliamentary systems, and its Acts have created many other parliaments.

In the 19th and 20th centuries, democratising countries often chose the British model of democracy; many countries that were once part of the British Empire adopted the British Westminster parliamentary system (see, for example, Representation of the People Act). English common law has served as the template for the legal systems of many countries. International commercial contracts are often based on English common law. The British Judicial Committee of the Privy Council still serves as the highest court of appeal for twelve former colonies.

Key statutes

Although there is no definitive list of constitutional statutes, there are certain statutes that are significant in the history of the Constitution of the United Kingdom. Some have been repealed, several have been amended and remain in statute, while others are current legislation as originally enacted. None are entrenched.

Scottish documents and statutes

Leges inter Brettos et Scottos 1124, Laws of the Brets (Welsh) and Scots
Declaration of Arbroath 1320, declaration sent to Pope asserting the sovereignty of the people of Scotland
Claim of Right Act 1689
Union with England Act 1707, based on the Treaty of Union and creates the new Parliament of Great Britain

Welsh statutes

Statute of Rhuddlan (1284)

English statutes

Magna Carta (1215), a revised version entered statute in 1297 and remains in statute today, although with most articles now repealed
Provisions of Oxford (1258)
Provisions of Westminster (1259)
Statute of Marlborough (1267)
Laws in Wales Acts 1535 and 1542, Wales became a full and equal part of the Kingdom of England with a single legal jurisdiction
Petition of Right (1628)
Instrument of Government (1653), first Constitution of England
Humble Petition and Advice (1657), second Constitution of England
Habeas Corpus Act 1679
Bill of Rights 1689
Act of Settlement 1701
Union with Scotland Act 1706, based on the Treaty of Union and creates the new Parliament of Great Britain

UK statutes

Acts of Union 1800, Union with Ireland Act passed by the Parliament of Great Britain. Unites the Kingdom of Great Britain and the Kingdom of Ireland to form the United Kingdom of Great Britain and Ireland
Reform Act 1832, Reform Act 1867, Reform Act 1884, Representation of the People Act 1918, Representation of the People Act 1928, Representation of the People Act 1949, Representation of the People Act 1969, extending the vote to all adults equally
Parliament Acts 1911 and 1949
Government of Ireland Act 1920, Irish Free State (Agreement) Act 1922, Irish Free State Constitution Act 1922, and Irish Free State (Consequential Provisions) Act 1922
Royal and Parliamentary Titles Act 1927
Statute of Westminster 1931
His Majesty's Declaration of Abdication Act 1936
United Nations Act 1946, enables the Government to implement resolutions under Article 41 of the United Nations Charter as Order in Council without the approval of Parliament
Life Peerages Act 1958, House of Lords Act 1999
European Communities Act 1972, European Union Act 2011
Northern Ireland Constitution Act 1973
Human Rights Act 1998
Scotland Act 1998, Government of Wales Act 1998, Northern Ireland Act 1998
Amended by the Government of Wales Act 2006, Northern Ireland Act 2006, Northern Ireland Act 2009, Scotland Act 2012, Wales Act 2014, Scotland Act 2016
Freedom of Information Act 2000, Political Parties, Elections and Referendums Act 2000, Civil Contingencies Act 2004, Constitutional Reform Act 2005
Constitutional Reform and Governance Act 2010, Fixed-term Parliaments Act 2011, Succession to the Crown Act 2013, Dissolution and Calling of Parliament Act 2022

See also 
 Ancient constitution of England
 Basic Law
 Constitutional monarchy
 Constitutional reform in the United Kingdom
 :Category:English constitutionalists
 Fundamental Laws of England
 History of democracy
 History of England
 History of the United Kingdom
 Lord Chancellor's Department
 Ministry of Justice
 Parliament in the Making
 Parliamentary sovereignty in the United Kingdom
 Rights of Englishmen
 Rule of law in the United Kingdom
 Secretary of State for Justice
 Separation of powers in the United Kingdom
 United Kingdom constitutional law

Notes

References

Bibliography

External links 
 Constitutional Law Chronology
 The Constitution Society feature and timeline on the British Constitution
 The Parliament and Constitution Centre
 The 'Mother of Parliaments' BBC Talking Politics
 Developing democracy BBC Democracy Day

Constitution
Constitution of the United Kingdom
Constitution
Constitution
Political charters